Phoney Cronies is a 1942 American comedy short by Columbia Pictures starring El Brendel, Tom Kennedy, Dudley Dickerson, and Monte Collins.

In the short, Oley (El Brendel), Tom (Tom Kennedy), and Petty Larsen (Dudley Dickerson), employees of a storage company, are tasked with bringing a crate of artifacts to a museum in the middle of the night. They don't know, however, that the crate really contains a thief who intends to rob the museum of its priceless Buddha statue.

External links 

 

1942 films
Columbia Pictures short films
1942 comedy films
American comedy short films
Films directed by Harry Edwards (director)
American black-and-white films
1940s American films